The United Africa Tigers are a Namibian football club. They are based in the Namibian capital Windhoek, and play in the country's top league, the Namibia Premier League. In the 1990s, they were sponsored by Mukorob Pelagic and referred to as the MP Tigers.

Achievements
Namibia Premier League: 2
 1985, 2015–16

NFA-Cup: 3
1995, 1996, 2015

External links
 
 
 

1942 establishments in South West Africa
Football clubs in Namibia
Namibia Premier League clubs
Sport in Windhoek
Association football clubs established in 1942